Thomas Torrance (1871–1959), born in Shotts, Scotland, was a Scottish Protestant missionary to China. He was first sent there by the China Inland Mission (CIM), and later by The American Bible Society. He married Annie Elizabeth Sharp (1883–1980) of the CIM in 1911. He was the father of the 20th century theologian, Thomas F. Torrance.

Biography 
Torrance was born in Shotts, Scotland in 1871. He came from a strong evangelical Church of Scotland background. He attended Hulme Cliff College in Derbyshire from 1892 to 1894, and then studied at Livingstone College, London from 1894 to 1895. After finishing his training at Cliff and Livingstone Colleges for missionary service, he was first sent to Chengdu, Sichuan in 1895, by the China Inland Mission (CIM). Torrance was stationed in Western Sichuan, from 1896 to 1910 as a missionary. While he was there, the Boxer Rebellion of 1900 occurred.

Torrance had a number of disagreements with the CIM and eventually left and returned to Scotland in 1910. While at the Edinburgh 1910 World Missionary Conference, he met  Dr. John R. Hykes, who was head of the  American Bible Society (ABS) in Shanghai. Hykes persuaded him to return to China to take over the West China agency of the ABS in Sichuan, based in Chengdu.

In 1911, Torrance married Annie Elizabeth Sharp who was also a member of the CIM, and was stationed in Guanxian. The couple had six children who were all born in China: Mary, Thomas F., Grace, Margaret, James, and David.

Due to unrest caused by Communist troops in the beginning of the Chinese Civil War, the Torrance family left China in 1927 and settled in Scotland. Thomas Torrance would return to China to continue his missionary work, without his family, for seven years, but leave China for the final time in 1934 due to the Chinese Civil War.

Torrance is known for being the first Westerner to make contact with the Qiang people, who he believed belonged to the Lost Tribes of Israel. He was also instrumental in establishing the West China Union University Archaeological Museum.

He died in Edinburgh in 1959.

See also 
 Protestantism in Sichuan

References

1871 births
1959 deaths
Christian writers
Protestant missionaries in Sichuan
Scottish Presbyterians
Scottish Protestant missionaries
British expatriates in China